Martin (until 1950, German: Turz-Sankt Martin, Latin: Sanctus Martinus / Martinopolis) is a city in northern Slovakia, situated on the Turiec river, between the Malá Fatra and Veľká Fatra mountains, near the city of Žilina. The population numbers approximately 54,000, which makes it the ninth-largest city in Slovakia. It is the center of the Turiec region and the District of Martin.

History
From the second half of the 10th century until 1918, it was part of the Kingdom of Hungary. The first recorded reference to Martin in written sources is dated to 1284 under the name of Vila Sancti Martini.

In the turbulent 15th century, Martin suffered from many disasters, for example from the attack of the Hussites in 1433, when the town was burned down. Just ten years later, it was destroyed again by an earthquake and Martin started to be slowly degraded from royal to the privileged town and under direct influence of the Révay family.

Since the 18th century, Martin became centre of the Turóc county.

The town became the foremost Slovak cultural center in the 19th century. Several cultural institutions (including Slovak Matica and Slovak National Museum) were founded there. Most political activities leading to the Slovak national emancipation in the 19th and early 20th centuries were organized in or from Martin. The town was also industrialized at this time. The first printing works were established in 1869, the furniture factory Tatra nábytok in 1890, and so on.

The town lost some of its importance after Pressburg (today's Bratislava) became the capital of Slovakia in 1919. Today, it is the seat of the Slovak National Library and Slovak Matica.

National Council of the Slovak Republic declared the city of Martin the center of national culture of the Slovaks on August 24, 1994.

The city of Martin won the United Nations Public Service Award in 2011 in the category: Preventing and Combating Corruption in the Public Service.

Geography
It is located in northern Slovakia, in the Turiec Basin, just south of the confluence of the Turiec river with Váh. Mountain ranges in the proximity of the city are Malá Fatra (Lesser Fatra) and Vel’ká Fatra (Greater Fatra); more to the south are the Žiar and Kremnica Mountains.
Martin has 10 boroughs: Jahodníky, Ľadoveň, Stred, Sever, Košúty, Podháj, Stráne, Priekopa, Tomčany and Záturčie.

Climate
Martin lies in the north temperate zone and has a continental climate with four distinct seasons. It is characterized by a significant variation between hot summers and cold, snowy winters. Snow cover lasts from 60 to 80 days per year.

Demographics
Martin has a population of 55,000 (as of December 31, 2016). Since end of 1990s when the population reached the top (more than 60,000) every year a slight decrease has been observed. According to the 2001 census, 94.9% of inhabitants were Slovaks, 1.6% Czechs, 0.5% Romani, and 0.2% Hungarians. The religious makeup was 44.1% Roman Catholics, 31.2% people with no religious affiliation, and 17.2% Lutherans.

According to the 2011 census, 81.7% of inhabitants were Slovaks, 1.0% Czechs, 0.09% Roma, and 0.2% Hungarians and 16.2% did not specify nationality. The religious makeup was 34.3% Roman Catholics, 28.3% people with no religious affiliation, 21.1% did not specify religion and 13.2% Lutherans.

Sights

The oldest building is a Romanesque church dedicated to Saint Martin of Tours (13th century). The Slovak National Museum placed its ethnographic collection in Martin. An open-air museum in the suburbs, the Museum of the Slovak Village (Jahodnícke háje), exhibits the traditional rural architecture and folk traditions of the region of Turiec. The Slovak National Cemetery is the official Slovak hall of fame, inspired by the Panthéon in Paris.
The Slovak Chamber Theatre in Martin was established in 1944 as the second professional theatre company in Slovakia. The theatre building is a landmark of the city center.

Martin is surrounded by Malá Fatra and Veľká Fatra mountains, which in winter offer excellent conditions for skiing.

There is a historic mansion in the town of Záturčie in Martin district.

Economy
Martin is home to a Volkswagen Group-owned automotive industry production plant, under the Volkswagen Slovakia, a.s. subsidiary.  Opened in 2000, it employs approximately 800 people. The city was hit hard in 2008 by the recession, as Volkswagen was forced to lay off over 200 workers. Other major industrial companies include ŽOS Vrútky (rail vehicles industry) or Prefa Sučany (concrete prefabricates).

The Danish shoe company ECCO is located near the Kosuty II borough in an industrial park. This park also hosts other companies such as MAR SK, GGB or Zinkpower.

The university hospital employs approximately two thousand persons: doctors, nurses and other staff. The printing company Neografia has clients in more than 15 European countries, where Neografia exports the decisive part of its production of books. Due to the economic crisis the unemployment rate rose to 10%, but was still below the national average rate. In March 2018, the unemployment rate was under 4%. Many inhabitants work in nearby town Žilina, that is an important industrial center and major city of region.

Education
Martin is home to the Jessenius Faculty of Medicine, which is one of three medical schools in Slovakia. Among its international students are up to 500 Norwegian and 100 Icelandic medical students.

The city's system of primary education consists of nine public schools, two private primary schools (BellAmos School), and two religious primary schools, enrolling in total 5,027 pupils. There is a plan to build a five-story high school near the main square. When completed, it will be the largest educational building in Slovakia apart from universities. The school will be named after Andrej Hlinka, a former Slovak politician.

Secondary education is represented by two gymnasia with 828 students, three specialized high schools with 1,050 students (Business Academy Martin), and three vocational schools with 2,501 students (data ).

Sport

The division, the Handball 1st league.

Transport
Martin lies on the crossroad that interconnect the main road (as well main railway) from Bratislava to Košice with Banská Bystrica. It is connected directly to Žilina, Turčianske Teplice and Ružomberok.

Public transport is not only in Martin itself, but it also extends to the surrounding town of Vrútky and to three villages (Bystrička, Lipovec, Turčianske Kľačany).

Martin is also served by Martin Airport, a small, general aviation airport used for gliding.

Twin towns — sister cities

Martin is twinned with:

 Bački Petrovac, Serbia
 Békéscsaba, Hungary
 Fargo, United States
 Gotha, Germany
 Hoogeveen, Netherlands
 Jičín, Czech Republic
 Kalisz, Poland
 Zheleznodorozhny, Russia

Notable people
Janko Alexy, painter
Miloš Alexander Bazovský, painter
Peter Bartoš, ice hockey player, silver medal at the WCH 2000. 5× Slovak Extraliga Champion
Martin Benka, painter
Barbora Bobuľová, actress
Tomáš Brcko, hockey player
Zdeno Cíger, ice hockey player, 3× bronze medal at the WCH 1989, 1990, 2003
Oto Haščák, ice hockey player, 2× bronze medal at the WCH 1989, 1990. 1× Czech Extraliga Champion
Stanislav Jančárik, or Estanislao Jancarik (in Spanish), architect who designed many buildings in Buenos Aires
Janko Jesenský, writer
Jaroslav Katriňák, endurance motorcycle racer, 9th overall place at 2007 Dakar Rally
Jana Kirschner, pop singer
Lucia Klocová, athlete, who specialises in the 800 metres
Andrej Kmeť, scientist
Ľuboš Kostelný, actor
Zora Mintalová - Zubercová, ethnographer, historian and museologist
Anton Neuwirth, Presidential candidate, Ambassador
Martin Obuch, professional ice hockey player
Lukáš Plank, Pathologist
Miloslav Schmidt, organizer of fire brigades
Róbert Švehla, ice hockey player, bronze medal at the WCH 1992, 2003
Radovan Somík, ice hockey player, world champion at the WCH 2002
Peter Smrek, ice hockey player, world champion at the WCH 2002
Richard Pánik, ice hockey player, several seasons in NHL, AHL Calder Cup Champion
Pavol Steiner (1908–1969), Olympic water polo player, swimmer, and cardiac surgeon
Ján Tabaček, ice hockey player, 2× Czech Extraliga Champion, 1x NLA Champion, 5× Slovakian Extraliga Champion
Petra Vajdová, actress, Best Actress award at 2016 DOSKY Awards
Ladislav Záborský, painter

References

External links

 Official municipal website of Martin

 
Cities and towns in Slovakia